Karimabad (also Romanized as Karīmābād) is a village in Aftab Rural District, Aftab District, Tehran County, Tehran Province, Iran. At the 2006 census, its population was 64, in 18 families.

References 

Populated places in Tehran County